Enteromius quadrilineatus is a cyprinid fish species in the family Cyprinidae. It is found in Burundi and Tanzania.

Its natural habitat is rivers. It is threatened by habitat loss.

References

Enteromius
Taxa named by Lore Rose David
Fish described in 1937
Taxonomy articles created by Polbot
Taxobox binomials not recognized by IUCN